Anna Danilina and Ekaterine Gorgodze were the defending champions but chose not to participate.

Alicia Barnett and Olivia Nicholls won the title, defeating Xenia Knoll and Oksana Selekhmeteva in the final, 6–7(7–9), 6–4, [10–7].

Seeds

Draw

Draw

References
Main Draw

Bellinzona Ladies Open - Doubles